Chulak-e Asali (also Romanized as Chūlak-e Āṣalī; also known as Chūlak) is a village in Tariq ol Eslam Rural District, in the Central District of Nahavand County, Hamadan Province, Iran. At the 2006 census, its population was 561, in 151 families.

Notable people 

 Abd-al-Baqi Nahavandi

References 

Populated places in Nahavand County